George Poeppel (6 November 1893 – 2 February 1917) was an Australian cricketer. He played in one first-class match for Queensland in 1914/15. He died in a prisoner-of-war camp in Germany during World War I.

See also
 List of Queensland first-class cricketers

References

External links
 

1893 births
1917 deaths
Australian cricketers
Queensland cricketers
Cricketers from Brisbane
Australian military personnel killed in World War I